Administrative Professionals Day (also known as Secretaries Day or Admin Day) is a day observed yearly in a small number of countries. It is not a public holiday in any of them. In some countries, it falls within Administrative Professionals Week (the last full week of April in the United States). The day recognizes the work of secretaries, administrative assistants, executive assistants, personal assistants, receptionists, client services representatives, and other administrative support professionals. Typically, administrative professionals are given cards, flowers, chocolates, and lunches.

Observance by country

 In the United States, Canada, Hong Kong, and Malaysia, it is celebrated annually on the Wednesday of the last full week of April.
 In New Zealand, it is usually celebrated on the Wednesday of the last full week of April, unless that falls on the ANZAC day public holiday when APD is celebrated the week earlier.
 In Belgium, France and the Netherlands, it is celebrated annually on the third Thursday of April.
 In Australia, it is celebrated annually on the first Friday of May.
 In South Africa, it is celebrated annually on the first Wednesday of September.
 In Brazil, it is celebrated annually on 9 September.

History

During World War II, there was a shortage of skilled administrative personnel in the United States due to Depression-era birth-rate decline and booming post-war business. The National Secretaries Association, founded in 1942, was formed to recognize the contributions of administrative personnel to the economy, support their personal development, and to help attract workers to the administrative field. Key figures who created the holiday were the president of the National Secretaries Association, Mary Barrett; president of Dictaphone Corporation, C. King Woodbridge; and public relations account executives at Young & Rubicam, Harry F. Klemfuss and Daren Ball.

The National Secretaries Association's name was changed to Professional Secretaries International in 1981 and to the International Association of Administrative Professionals (IAAP) in 1998. Administrative Professionals Day is a registered trademark with registration number 2475334 (serial number 75/898930). The registrant is IAAP.

The official period of celebration was first proclaimed by U.S. Secretary of Commerce Charles W. Sawyer as "National Secretaries Week", which was held June 1–7 in 1952 with Wednesday, June 4 designated as National Secretaries' Day. The first Secretaries' Day was sponsored by the National Secretaries Association with the support of corporate groups.

In 1955, the observance date of National Secretaries Week was moved to the last full week of April, with Wednesday now designated as Administrative Professionals Day. The name was changed to Professional Secretaries Week in 1981 and became Administrative Professionals Week in 2000 to encompass the expanding responsibilities and wide-ranging job titles of administrative support staff in the modern economy.  The week-long observance was created in order to space out the bookings at restaurants, country clubs, and other places where administrative professionals would be taken out to lunch.

Criticism

Some critics take an anti-consumerist stance and accuse the flower, card, and candy industries of inventing the holiday for convenient sales between Easter and Mother's Day, which is the second Sunday of May in the United States. It has also been argued that the typical gifts of flowers and cards unintentionally mark the holiday and the administrative role as a gendered one, since these are typically feminine gifts, and that a specific day to celebrate administrative staff "ghettoizes" and separates the administrative staff from the rest of their workplace peers.

See also
Hallmark holiday
Boss's Day
Employee Appreciation Day

References

April observances
September observances
Holidays and observances by scheduling (nth weekday of the month)
Types of secular holidays